The National Basketball League Most Improved Player is an annual National Basketball League (NBL) award first presented in the 2019 New Zealand NBL season to an up-and-coming player who made a dramatic improvement from the previous season or seasons. It was not awarded in 2020.

Winners

See also
 List of National Basketball League (New Zealand) awards

References

Awards established in 2019
M